Bethel High School is a public high school in Miami County, Ohio. It is the only high school in the Bethel Local School district. The student enrollment is about 345, in grades 9–12. Their nickname is the Bees.

History
Originally the school was known as Bethel Township School which was constructed in 1917 and housed grade K-12. In 1958 the 1917 building underwent its second expansion and Bethel High School was added, attached to the 1917 building. The 1917 building was renamed Bethel Elementary School and now houses grades K-6. In 2017 a third expansion was added on to the school, which was the new high school building.

Mission statement
The mission statement of Bethel Junior High and High School is to prepare students for post-high education and careers with an attitude of respect and tolerance toward diversity.

Athletics

Ohio High School Athletic Association State Championships
 Boys Basketball – 2001 
 Girls Basketball – 1986

Notable alumni/students
 Susan Blackwell, Actress credited with the Broadway show, [title of show]
 Donald N. Frey, Ford Mustang engineer/designer
 Roy J. Plunkett, invented Teflon

External links
 District Website

Notes and references

WAP WAP WAP

High schools in Miami County, Ohio
Public high schools in Ohio
1958 establishments in Ohio